Natpadhigaram 79 is a 2016 Indian Tamil language film written and directed by Ravichandran. The film features Raj Bharath, Amzath Khan, Reshmi Menon and Tejaswi Madivada in the leading roles, with Deepak Nilambur composing the film's music and the film was released in March 2016

Cast 
 Raj Bharath as Jeeva
 Amzath Khan as Aravind
 Reshmi Menon as Maha
 Tejaswi Madivada as Pooja
 Subbu Panchu
 M. S. Bhaskar as Maha's father
 Vignesh Karthick as Jeeva's friend
 Uma Padmanabhan
 Vinodhini Vaidyanathan
 Ramanathan
 Rail Ravi
 Raju Sundaram special appearance in the song "Sollu Sollu Chellamma"
 Sridhar special appearance in the song "Sollu Sollu Chellamma"

Production 
Director Ravichandran re-emerged from a sabbatical and began making a film on friendship featuring his nephew Raj Bharath during late 2014. Other rookie actors Amzath Khan, Reshmi Menon and Tejaswi Madivada were signed on to play further leading roles in the project. Raj Bharath also worked as an assistant director to Ravichandran during the making of the film. The film's shoot progressed throughout mid 2014 in Bangalore, Mysore, Chennai and Pondicherry, before the climax scenes were shot in October 2014.

Despite being ready for release in April 2015, the team failed to find a distributor amidst several other film releases during the period. The team subsequently added another song, featuring Raju Sundaram, before announcing their release date in March 2016.

Soundtrack 
Soundtrack was composed by Deepak Nilambar.
"Sollu Chellamma" – Deva
"Nanba" – Haricharan, Deepak Nilambar
"Thozha" – Deepak Nilambur
"Shaila" – Naresh Iyer

Reception
The film opened to mixed reviews upon release in March 2016, with a critic from The Hindu noting it has an "interesting premise but is a disappointing film". Likewise, another critic from The New Indian Express wrote "Natpadhigaram would have been an apt tribute to friendship and love, if only the screenplay was crafted more coherently and convincingly".

References

External links
 

2010s Tamil-language films